Oligodon moricei, commonly known as Morice's kukri snake, is a species of snake in the family Colubridae. The species is endemic to southern Vietnam.

Etymology
The specific name, moricei, is in honor of French naturalist Albert Morice.

Description
The species O. morecei differs from its cogenerates by the combination of a “rusty brown” vertebral stripe edged by two black stripes, 12 maxillary teeth, 17 dorsal scale rows, a large number of ventral scales, seven supralabials, and a dark belly.

References

Further reading
Vassilieva, Anna B., et al. (2013). "A new species of Kukri Snake (Oligodon Fitzinger, 1826; Squamata: Colubridae) from the Cat Tien National Park, southern Vietnam". Zootaxa 3702 (3): 233–246. (Oligodon cattienensis, new species).
Neang, Thy; Grismer, L. Lee; Daltry, Jennifer C. (2012). "A new species of kukri snake (Colubridae: Oligodon Fitzinger, 1826) from the Phnom Samkos Wildlife Sanctuary, Cardamom Mountains, southwest Cambodia". Zootaxa 3388: 41–55. (Oligodon kampucheaensis, new species).
David, Patrick; Das, Indraneil; Vogel, Gernot (2011). "On some taxonomic and nomenclatural problems in Indian species of the genus Oligodon Fitzinger, 1826 (Squamata: Colubridae)". Zootaxa 2799: 1–14.

External links

moricei
Endemic fauna of Vietnam
Reptiles of Vietnam
Reptiles described in 2008

Snakes of Vietnam
Snakes of Asia